Revision is a process in writing of rearranging, adding, or removing paragraphs, sentences, or words. Writers may revise their writing after a draft is complete or during the composing process. Revision involves many of the strategies known generally as editing but also can entail larger conceptual shifts of purpose and audience as well as content. Many writers go through multiple rounds of revisions before they reach a final draft: "Few writers are so expert that they can produce what they are after on the first try. Quite often you will discover, on examining the completed work, that there are serious flaws in the arrangement of the material, calling for transpositions... do not be afraid to experiment with your text."

Within the writing process, revision comes once one has written a draft to work with, so that one can re-see and improve it, iteratively. Working at both deeper and more surface levels a writer can increase the power of the text. 

In an essay, revision may involve the identification of a thesis, a reconsideration of structure or organization, working at uncovering weaknesses,elaborating evidence and illustrations, or clarifying unclear positions.

In general, revision of written work can be guided by questions such as:

 Is the writing clear? Does it make sense?
 Is there enough information to describe ideas?
 Is there too much information so that the writing wanders off topic?
 Are the ideas or the narrative flow in a logical order?

Revision is a larger category of writing behaviors than line-editing or proofreading, though writers often make large reorganizations and word-level edits simultaneously. There are theories such as the three-component model hypothesized by Linda Flower and John R. Hayes and James Britton et al.'s model of the writing process as a series of stages described in metaphors of linear growth, conception - incubation - production.  Here, a review by the writer or a third party, which often give corrective annotations, is part of the process that leads to the revision stage. In educational settings, peer revision or feedback, is a common collaborative writing practice. In organizational and other workplace settings where collaborative writing is common, participation of multiple writers facilitates communal revision.  Recently, due to the collaborative capabilities of the Internet, there are writers who "crowdsource" reviews from several people, who contribute digital annotations. 

For further reading see the reference guide:

A. Horning & A. Becker (Eds.) (2006). Revision: History, Theory, and Practice. Parlor Press and WAC Clearinghouse.

References

Writing
Textual scholarship
Composition (language)